Brainstorm Media is a full service American film distributor and production company based in Los Angeles, California. Founded in 1995, it is recognized for its expertise in video on demand, TV, and theatrical release strategies. In addition to distribution, Brainstorm Media closely works with networks and Internet platforms to develop financing and production strategies.

News

In 2014 Brainstorm Media partnered with the North American home video company Shout Factory to release Jack and the Cuckoo-Clock Heart.

Additionally, Brainstorm Media picked up the U.S. rights to I Am Here from TrustNordisk.

Releases
Brainstorm Media has developed and released dozens of programs, including:

 Kathy Griffin: A Hell of a Story (2019) - by Troy Miller
 Havenhurst (2016) - by Andrew C. Erin
 The 11th Hour (2014) – by Anders Morgenthaler
 A Liar's Autobiography: The Untrue Story of Monty Python's Graham Chapman (2013) – featuring Graham Chapman
 Something to Talk About (2013) – by Brainstorm Media and DirecTV
 A Daughter's Nightmare (2013) – by Vic Sarin
 Mortified Nation (2013) – by Michael Mayer
 Copperhead (2013) – by Ronald F. Maxwell
 Desert Runners (2013) – by Jennifer Steinman
 Shored Up (2013) – by Ben Kalina
 Germ (2013) – by J.T. Boone
 Drawing Dead: The Highs & Lows of Online Poker (2013) – by Mike Weeks
 Sin Reaper 3D (2013) – by Sebastian Bartolitius
 The American Scream (2012) – by Michael Stephenson
 Entity (2012) – by Steve Stone
 Least Among Saints (2012) – by Martin Papazian
 The Discoverers (2012) – by Justin Schwarz
 Axed (2012) – by Ryan Lee Driscoll
 The Girl (2012) – by David Riker
 Dark Horse (2012) – by Todd Solondz
 Lynching Charlie Lynch (2012) – by Rick Ray
 Boys of Bonneville: Racing on a Ribbon of Salt (2011) – by Curt Wallin
 Dorfman in Love (2011) – by Brad Leong

Productions

 Fender Bender (2016)
 13 Nights of Elvira (2014)
 Blast Vegas (2013) 
 The American Scream (2012)
 A Liar's Autobiography (2012) 
 Stolen Seas (2012) 
 Let Freedom Sing (2009) 
 Engaged to Kill (2006) 
 Crimson Force (2005)
 Three Way (2004)

References

Film production companies of the United States
Mass media companies established in 1995
Film distributors of the United States